Kerameies (also Κεραμιές - Keramies) is a community located in the southern part of the island of Kefalonia. It was the seat of the municipality of Leivatho. In the village is the largest school in the area, from kindergarten to high school named "Vallianio Likio Keramion" (http://lyk-keram.kef.sch.gr). It is situated in low hills, at about 140 m elevation. Kerameies is 2 km south of Peratata, 2 km east of Metaxata and 9 km southeast of Argostoli. The village was home to two families of merchants and shipowners, Lykiardopoulos and Vallianos. The Vallianos family is considered a great benefactor of Greece as a result of their donations made to the country, and particularly for the funding of the building of the National Library of Greece in Athens (1888–1903).  The village as well as almost the entire island (excluding the Fiskardo area) was struck by the 1953 Ionian earthquake that shook and destroyed every building in the village.

Population

Notable people 
Panayis Athanase Vagliano (1814–1902) merchant and shipowner

External links
Kerameies on GTP Travel Pages (in English and Greek)
Βαλλιάνειο Λύκειο Κεραμειών (Vallianio Likio Keramion)

See also

List of settlements in Cephalonia

References

Populated places in Cephalonia